Tetragonia tetragonioides, commonly called New Zealand spinach, Warrigal greens and other local names, is a flowering plant in the fig-marigold family (Aizoaceae). It is often cultivated as a leafy vegetable.

It is a widespread species, native to eastern Asia, Australia, and New Zealand. It has been introduced and is an invasive species in many parts of Africa, Europe, North America, and South America. Its natural habitat is sandy shorelines and bluffs, often in disturbed areas. It is a halophyte and grows well in saline ground.

Description
The plant has a trailing habit, and will form a thick carpet on the ground or climb through other vegetation and hang downwards. It can have erect growth when young. The leaves of the plant are 3–15 cm long, triangular in shape, and bright green. The leaves are thick, and covered with tiny papillae that look like waterdrops on the top and bottom of the leaves. The flowers of the plant are yellow, and the fruit is a small, hard capsule covered with small horns.

Taxonomy
Prussian naturalist Peter Pallas described the species as Demidovia tetragonoides in 1781. German botanist Otto Kuntze placed the species in the genus Tetragonia in his 1891 work Revisio Generum Plantarum, resulting in its current binomial name.

This widely distributed plant has many common names, depending on its location. In addition to the name New Zealand spinach, it is also known as Botany Bay spinach, Cook's cabbage, kōkihi (in Māori), sea spinach, and tetragon. Its Australian names of Warrigal Greens and Warrigal Cabbage come from the local use of warrigal to describe plants that are wild (not farmed originally).

Cultivation

It is grown for the edible leaves, and can be used as food or an ornamental plant for ground cover. It can be an annual or perennial. As some of its names signify, it has similar flavour and texture properties to spinach, and is cooked like spinach. Like spinach, it contains oxalates; its medium to low levels of oxalates need to be removed by blanching the leaves in hot water for one minute, then rinsing in cold water before cooking. It thrives in hot weather, and is considered an heirloom vegetable. Few insects consume it, and even slugs and snails do not seem to feed on it.

The thick, irregularly-shaped seeds should be planted just after the last spring frost. Before planting, the seeds should be soaked for 12 hours in cold water, or 3 hours in warm water. The seedlings will emerge in 10–20 days, and it will continue to produce greens through the summer. Mature plant will self-seed. Seeds will overwinter up to USDA zone 5.

As food
The species, rarely used by indigenous people as a leaf vegetable, was first documented by Captain Cook. It was immediately picked, cooked, and pickled to help fight scurvy, and taken with the crew of the Endeavour. It spread when the explorer and botanist Joseph Banks took seeds back to Kew Gardens during the latter half of the 18th century. For two centuries, T. tetragonioides was the only cultivated vegetable to have originated from Australia and New Zealand.

There are some indications that Māori did eat kōkihi perhaps more regularly. According to Murdoch Riley, "to counteract the bitterness of the older leaves of this herb, the Māori boiled it with the roots of the convolvulus (pōhue)", in reference to species of Convolvulaceae now classified as Calystegia. The tips of the spinach can be pinched off and eaten raw or cooked.

Nutrition
When consumed after boiling, New Zealand spinach is 95% water, 2% carbohydrates, 1% protein, and contains negligible fat, while supplying only 12 calories (table). In a 100 gram reference amount, the spinach is particularly rich in vitamin K, providing 278% of the Daily Value (DV). It also contains appreciable amounts of vitamin B6, vitamin C, and manganese (18-25% DV).

Gallery

References

External links

tetragonioides
Bushfood
Caryophyllales of Australia
Crops originating from Argentina
Crops originating from Asia
Crops originating from Australia
Crops originating from Chile
Crops originating from New Zealand
Eudicots of Western Australia
Flora of Japan
Flora of New South Wales
Flora of Norfolk Island
Flora of Lord Howe Island
Flora of South Australia
Flora of Queensland
Flora of Tasmania
Flora of Victoria (Australia)
Leaf vegetables